Saleem Raza may refer to:
 Saleem Raza (cricketer)
 Saleem Raza (singer)